Return of the Rebels (working title The Eagle Rock Rebels Ride Again) is a 1981 American made-for-television biker drama film starring Barbara Eden, Don Murray, Christopher Connelly, Robert Mandan, Jamie Farr and Patrick Swayze. It originally premiered on CBS on October 17, 1981.

Directed by Noel Nosseck and produced by Filmways Television, the film was one of Patrick Swayze's first feature roles.

Synopsis
Mary Beth Allen (Barbara Eden), a retired former motorcycle club member, is a widowed operator of a campground along the Colorado River (Big Bend National Park) which is being threatened and taken over by a group of "River Rats" led by K.C. Barnes (Patrick Swayze) that drive away the campground's regular clients.

Mary Beth is helped by her friends, former members of "The Eagle Rock Rebels" motorcycle gang (Don Murray, Christopher Connelly, Robert Mandan and Jamie Farr), who come to the camp for their 25-year reunion and run off the troublemakers. Mary Beth starts a relationship with Sonny (Don Murray).

Cast
Barbara Eden - Mary Beth Allen
 Don Murray - Sonny Morgan
Christopher Connelly - Jay Arnold Wayne
Robert Mandan - Big Al Williams
Jamie Farr - Mickey Fine
Patrick Swayze - K.C. Barnes

Filming
Return of the Rebels was filmed on location from April to May 1981 at Lake Havasu City in Mohave County, Arizona.

Home media
On October 18, 2011, Return of the Rebels was released as an exclusive manufacture-on-demand (MOD) DVD-R by MGM Limited Edition Collection.

References

External links

1981 television films
1981 films
1981 drama films
CBS network films
Motorcycling films
Films set in Lake Havasu City, Arizona
Films set in Mohave County, Arizona
Films shot in Arizona
American drama television films
Films directed by Noel Nosseck
1980s American films